This is a list of characters from South of Nowhere, the American television program created by Thomas W. Lynch.

Carlin family

Spencer Carlin

Ohio to Los Angeles, California. Season 1 focused on the issue of her own sexual orientation and relationship with her new friend Ashley Davies. Spencer was for a short time attracted to Ashley's ex-boyfriend Aiden Dennison while maintaining an awkward, semi-romantic relationship with Ashley. In the season 1 finale, Spencer came to the conclusion that she wasn't straight, and that she was in love with Ashley. In the same episode Ashley and Spencer share a kiss.

In the season 2 premiere, it is revealed that they had spent the night with one other. During most of Season 2, Spencer dealt with her new romantic relationship with Ashley which was plagued with her jealousy over Ashley's semi-relationship with Aiden. When Spencer's mother, Paula, walked in on them in a compromising position, Ashley was somewhat violently thrown out of the house and Spencer was kept away from Ashley. Her mother attempted to bring in a therapist to "fix" her, but her father, Arthur, wouldn't stand for it. Spencer couldn't deal with the situation at home any longer, and when Ashley came by to run away with her, she leaped at the chance. After returning home, Spencer begins to patch things up with her mother, and she and Ashley are out of the closet, but not truly free. To compound things, a love triangle develops between Ashley, Spencer, and Aiden as his feelings for Ashley return that she had been returning. Season 2 ends with Spencer pleading for Ashley to decide between herself and Aiden who just before expressed his feelings towards Ashley. Just before Ashley is able to say her choice the prom drive by shooting takes place.

At the beginning of season 3 we learn that Spencer wasn't hurt but her brother Clay was killed in the shooting. Spencer ends up breaking up with Ashley after she returns from Europe. Her reasoning for the break up were due to Ashley's lack of support and communication for the three months following the prom shooting and Clay's death. Ashley begins to date Aiden once again, while Spencer and Ashley try to maintain their fragile friendship. Spencer meets Carmen a fellow gay student of King High while talking to Chelsea at school. After a session of painting and getting to know one another at Chelsea's art studio, the two girls kiss and begin dating. Just as Spencer's relationship with Carmen was beginning to get off the ground, the two get into a fight at Chelsea's studio after a night at Ego. The fight ended with Carmen pushing Spencer in to a wall. In the episode Fighting Crime Spencer official ends the relationship leaving Carmen with no reason to stay in town when her family moves to San Diego. In the same episode Spencer accompanies Ashley to a meeting with Ethan Marks about a record deal to produce a tribute album to Ashley's father. Spencer's relationship with her mother is further strained in Saturday Night is for Fighting when Spencer goes to a movie with Patrick, a boy who Paula had tried to set Spencer up with in season 2. After Spencer returns from hanging out with Patrick her mother greets her at the door, happy that Spencer is seeing a guy. Her mother's happiness is short-lived after Spencer pours her heart out wishing her mother would accept her for who she is. In the following episode Gay Pride, they begin to heal their relationship after Ashley convinces Paula to go with her to Pride, which shows Spencer that she's willing to fix their problems. In the same episode, Ashley's ability to get Paula to go to Pride shows Spencer that Ashley has grown up. At the end of the episode, Spencer shows up at Ashley's new loft in a trench coat, which she drops to reveal that she has nothing on underneath. They then share a kiss and begin to restart their relationship.

Glen Carlin

Glen (Chris Hunter) is the athlete of the family and the eldest child. He played basketball for the school team while attending King High and maintained a rivalry and friendship with Aiden, the former star of the team before Glen's arrival. In season 1, he began dating Madison Duarte after she broke up with Aiden in favor of Glen's position on the team. When he tore his ACL in a pick-up game of basketball, Madison immediately broke up with him. He became addicted to painkillers and was briefly arrested for attempting to buy more from a drug dealer. Glen soon began rehab three times a week, and at the end of season 2, he announces at prom that he has signed up for the army.

Glen is generally supportive of his siblings and initially liked Ashley, but when he first realized what was going on between Ashley and Spencer, he was not pleased with the idea of his sister being a lesbian. After Spencer accidentally received a black eye from the gay bashing of another male student, Glen became angry and cold towards both girls. He went so far as to fight with his brother Clay in the hospital, claiming that Spencer was not truly Clay's sister due to his being adopted. He eventually made up with Clay and Spencer and warmed up to Ashley again and finally appeared to accept Spencer's sexual orientation.

In the season 3 premiere, after graduating, Glen got a job at a sporting goods store with the help of Aiden. He was contacted by the army soon after to begin boot camp and began having second thoughts about enlisting. He finally reveals to his family what he has done and manages to get out of the army when his father, Arthur, explains to the sergeant that Glen initially joined with a fake I.D. and was underage. He also began helping and spending time with Chelsea Lewis in the aftermath of Clay's death.

Clay Carlin

Clay (Danso Gordon) is the only black kid in an all-white family. He was eight when the Carlin family adopted him. After moving to Los Angeles, Clay was forced to deal with many issues concerning race and discrimination. He befriended Sean Miller and began dating Chelsea Lewis. Clay also searched out his biological mother, Cecily Jordan, who reveals that she initially gave Clay up because she wanted him to have a better life than what she could give him. After a rocky start, Cecily moves to L.A. to be closer to Clay and be in his life. They slowly started to repair their relationship.

In season 2, Clay lost his virginity to Chelsea and it was later revealed that Chelsea was pregnant. He was initially shocked when Chelsea decides that she may not want the baby, and did not know what to do when she became distant towards him. Clay came to the conclusion that he loved Chelsea and would support her and her decision about the pregnancy no matter what it was. He, along with Chelsea, also realized Spencer's true feelings for Ashley before Spencer came out. Unlike Glen he was extremely supportive and accepting of his sister's sexual orientation the entire time.

In the season 3 premiere, it was revealed that Clay died from his wounds as a result of the drive-by shooting on prom night. A memorial at King High was made to him and the other victims of the shooting, as well as a fictional MTV True Life documentary.

Arthur Carlin

Arthur (Rob Moran) is the father of the Carlin family and was a "hero" social worker back in Ohio. However, after moving to L.A. because of his wife's job, he is having trouble adapting to big city life. Arthur keeps the family together, and sticks up for his daughter Spencer whenever Paula tries to start fights with her about being gay. Arthur tries everything to keep the family together, and it usually works. Even when his wife was cheating on him with another doctor at the hospital she works at, he tried to fix that problem. And it worked.

Paula Carlin

Paula (Maeve Quinlan) is the main reason the Carlin family moved so that she could begin a new job in the E.R. in Los Angeles. Her new job has put a large strain on her family life, as well as her marriage. She had been cheating on her husband with Ben, a doctor like herself. At the end of the episode "Come Out, Come Out, Wherever You Are", she discovered her daughter and Ashley are together. She violently threw Ashley from her house, and forbade Spencer from seeing her. She is incredibly homophobic for a while, even inviting a man to come straighten her out. Her prejudice attitudes in regards to homosexuality seems to have stemmed from her strict Catholic upbringing as a child.  She gets over her homophobia later in the series. Paula has always hated Ashley until the episode "Gay Pride".

Davies-Woods Family

Ashley Davies

Ashley (Mandy Musgrave) comes from a rich family because her father is a famous rock star, Raife Davies, played by C. C. DeVille. However, she faces many family issues, mostly neglect from her mother Christine due to her sexual orientation. She formerly dated Aiden Dennison and it is revealed that she was once pregnant with his child. After she lost the baby due to miscarriage, she decided that she's "mostly into girls" and has referred to herself as "a gay lesbian". At first, she became Spencer's best friend and helped her discover her sexual identity. At the end of the first season, after Spencer comes to the conclusion that she is into girls, Ashley and Spencer kiss. At the beginning of the second season, Ashley's father is killed in a car crash and she is shocked to discover he had another child at the same time as her birth, her newly discovered half-sister, Kyla. She doesn't get along with Kyla but they eventually learn to live together. She runs away with Spencer after Paula discovers that Spencer and Ashley are together. She is torn between the choice of Spencer or Aiden when she comes back from her trip. After the aftermath of prom, Spencer and Ashley break-up because of Ashley's lack of communication with Spencer while she was in Europe in the summer, after Spencer's brother, Clay is killed in the drive-by shooting at prom.  but she continues to try to get Spencer back, telling her she's never going to stop trying. In the episode Gay Pride, Spencer surprises Ashley by showing up at her door while they were on the phone. Spencer asks her to open her door which she does; Spencer drops her trench coat which reveals that she has nothing underneath. They then share a kiss and begin to restart their relationship

Kyla Woods

Kyla (Eileen April Boylan) is Ashley's long-lost half-sister, who appears after the death of their father, Raife Davies. She leaves her home in Baltimore but still keeps in touch with her mother Ann. She starts dating Aiden but returns to Baltimore for a while to formally break up with the boyfriend that she left, though she doesn't mention him to Aiden. Madison lets it slip that Kyla still had a boyfriend back home and Aiden breaks up with Kyla once she gets back to town. They decided to start over as friends and they later got back together, as Aiden's feelings for Ashley resurfaces. She and Spencer have started to form a friendship. She and Ashley have also started to form a more sister-like relationship with each other. She is Buddhist.

King High School

Aiden Dennison
Aiden (Matt Cohen) was the former star of the basketball team before Glen came along. At the time, he was dating Madison, though still not over his breakup with Ashley. Once Spencer came on the scene, he became friends with Spencer and started hanging out with her and Ashley, causing Madison to break up with him over jealousy. Following his breakup with Madison, he became primarily focused on Spencer. However, after discovering that Spencer would rather be with Ashley than with him, he slept with Madison, but soon broke up with her. He started dating Kyla Woods but decided to stop when he found out that she had left town for a while to see her ex-boyfriend. The two started to date again and went to Prom together, despite his love for Ashley, which is revealed to everyone at prom. Aiden and Ashley get back together, but after discovering that she was using him to get over her breakup with Spencer, and realize she still in love with Spencer he calls the relationship off. In the episode titled 'Career Day' Aiden begins dating Sasha Miller.

Madison Duarte

Madison (Valery Ortiz) is the stereotypical "queen-bee" cheerleader—beautiful, popular and snobby. At the start of the series, she dated Aiden. However, once Glen became the new basketball star, she moved on and began dating Glen. However, after Glen injured his knee and lost any chance getting a scholarship to a respectable college, she resumed dating Aiden. Aiden ended up dumping her, but she still refused to go back out with Glen. Madison finds out about Kyla's ex-boyfriend and slyly reveals this to Aiden. Her parents lost their money which caused drama for Madison. She was forced to get a job and was later fired after she was caught stealing money. She was then kicked off the cheerleading squad. Her parents then sent her to a hospital because they were afraid she was going to hurt herself. When she returned to school, she had no friends, only a reluctant Aiden who sat with her at lunch. She went to Prom with Glen. As a result of these humbling experiences, Madison became a kinder and more tolerant person as a whole, even going so far as to apologizing to Spencer and Ashley for always taunting them about their sexuality, much to Ashley's surprise.

Carmen

Carmen (Brooke Vallone) is a new student at King High who first appears in season 3. She meets Chelsea in the administration office where they have a short chat. Later she finds Chelsea struggling to sketch an image and ends up posing briefly for her. Chelsea invites Carmen to her studio to paint and while there, Carmen meets Spencer. While Spencer keeps her company, Carmen reveals that she moves around frequently and has had a girlfriend in the past. They bond during their painting session and share a kiss. They start dating. Paula walks in on her painting a picture of Spencer half naked. She gets jealous when she sees Ashley and starts to freak out. During an argument over Spencer's relationship with Ashley, Carmen shoves Spencer into a wall, and after that they break up and Carmen moves away to San Diego.

In the second half of season 3, she returns. She becomes friends with Kyla (unknown to Ashley and Spencer) and ends up moving into Kyla and Ashley's loft.
By the end of the season of season 3 Ashley kicks her out after Carmen almost kisses her.

Sean Miller

Sean (Austen Parros) is Clay's best friend and helps him deal with many race-based issues. While being very smart, he tends to sometimes hang out in the wrong areas and/or get himself into trouble.

Chelsea Lewis

Chelsea (Aasha Davis) was Clay's girlfriend and fellow high school student. She is an extremely talented artist, and wants to sell her paintings for a living. After losing their virginities to each other, Chelsea discovered she was pregnant. She wanted to have an abortion, which caused tension in her relationship with Clay. After getting in a minor car accident, Clay's mother Paula discovered the pregnancy while working at the hospital Chelsea was in. She tells her that she knew what it was like to have a baby at a young age since she was secretly pregnant before she was married. Chelsea ultimately decides to have the baby, but has to stay with the Carlin's when her parents kick her out. Despite her recent problems, Chelsea and Clay decide to go to their school prom with his siblings. While outside, a drive-by shooting takes place. Leaving several people, including Clay, dead.

Several months later, Chelsea is shown to have fully embraced her pregnancy. During this time, she develops a closer relationship with Glen, who is also struggling with the loss of Clay. In the season 3 episode "Fighting Crime," Chelsea loses her baby after someone rams into Glen's car while she's inside. She later learns from Paula that the baby would've been a girl. After the loss of both Clay and her unborn baby, Chelsea falls into a depression and doesn't leave the house for several days. She eventually starts to put herself together, and restarts her art career. She then develops feelings for Glen, and the two ultimately decide to be together.

Sherry Pena

Sherry (Marisa Lauren) is one of the popular cheerleaders at King High and was Madison's best friend. She and Madison made things difficult for anyone they don't like; therefore, Ashley and Spencer usually get taunted by them about their sexuality. She eventually became captain of the cheerleader squad and kicked Madison off the team.

Boz

Boz (Quentin Price) is Sean's more street-savvy cousin. He is often involved in some type of controversy or trouble, but is nonetheless loyal to those he hangs around. He serves as the voice for those in lower economic bracket. He is a "street kid with a heart of gold".

Miscellaneous characters

Cecily Jordan

Cecily (Tempestt Bledsoe) is the biological mother of Clay Carlin. She gave him up for adoption because she believed he would have a better life with a family that could support him. When Clay attempted to find her later, she was initially unreceptive to him. After having a chance to think about things, she moved to L.A. to be closer to Clay and tried to be a part of his life. The two slowly repaired their relationship and she offered advice to him on Chelsea's pregnancy.

External links
The-N's South of Nowhere character page
Tom Lynch Company - South of Nowhere

South of Nowhere
South of Nowhere